Kevin "Satch" Satchell (born 22 September 1988) is a British former professional boxer who competed from 2010 to 2016. He held the British, Commonwealth and European Boxing Union European flyweight titles between 2012 and 2014. Satchell announced his retirement from boxing in January 2018.

Amateur boxing career
Satchell represented Everton Red Triangle ABC as an amateur.

Professional boxing record

References 

1988 births
Living people
English male boxers
Boxers from Liverpool
Bantamweight boxers